A comet is a small astronomical body which orbits the sun.

Comet may also refer to:

Arts and entertainment

Music
 Comet (band), an American band
 Comet (The Bouncing Souls album) (2012)
 Comet (Younha album) (2007)
 "Comet" (song), an American children's song
 Comet (Firefall album) (2020)
 "Comet" (Yoasobi song) (2021)

Print
 Comet (Archie Comics), a fictional superhero
 Comet (Impact Comics), based on the Archie Comics character
 Comet (DC Comics), either of two fictional comic book characters
 Captain Comet, a DC Comics superhero
 Comet (Marvel Comics), a fictional character
 Comet (magazine), a US pulp science fiction magazine
 The Comet (UK comics)
 The Comet (newspaper), based in Stevenage, Hertfordshire 
 The Comet (fanzine), a science fiction fanzine
 Comet, a fictional magical broomstick in the Harry Potter series
 "The Comet" (short story), by W.E.B. DuBois
 Comet (book), by Carl Sagan and Ann Druyan
 Surrey Comet, a weekly local newspaper published in London
 The Daily Comet, a newspaper in Thibodaux, Louisiana

Roller coasters
 Comet (Great Escape), in New York
 Comet (Hersheypark), in Pennsylvania
 Comet (Lincoln Park), in Massachusetts
 Comet (Waldameer), in Pennsylvania

Other
 Comet (film), a 2014 American romantic comedy-drama
 Comets (film), a 2019 Georgian drama
 Comet (pinball), a pinball machine
 Comet (TV network)
 Princess Comet, a Japanese TV and manga series
 Comet, a dog appearing in the television series Full House
 Comet, one of Santa Claus's reindeer

Military
 Comet (tank), a British armoured vehicle
 , any of several ships of the British Royal Navy
 , any of several United States Navy ships
 , an Imperial German Navy aviso (dispatch boat)
 Comet line, a World War II resistance group

People
 Catherine Comet (born 1944), American symphony conductor
 Noah Comet (fl. 2010s), professor of English literature at the United States Naval Academy
 Gale Sayers (born 1943), NFL Hall of Famer known as "The Kansas Comet"

Places

Populated places
 Comet, Queensland, Australia
 Comet, Arkansas, United States
 Comet, Missouri, United States
 Comet, Montana, United States
 Comet, North Carolina, United States
 Comet, Jackson County, Ohio, United States
 Comet, Summit County, Ohio, United States

Other locations
 Comet River, Queensland, Australia
 Comet Mountain (British Columbia), Canada
 Mount Comet, in the Christmas Mountains of New Brunswick, Canada
 Comet Mountain, Montana, United States
 Comet Peak, Nevada, United States
 Comet Falls, Washington, United States
 Comet Geyser, Yellowstone National Park, Wyoming, United States
 Comet Galaxy, a spiral galaxy 3.2 billion light years from Earth

Science
 Comet (fish), a marine fish
 Comet (goldfish)
 Comet moth
 Comet, the ancestor of the shorthorn cattle breed
 Comet (experiment), searching for coherent neutrino-less conversion of a muon to an electron
 Bronze-tailed comet, Polyonymus caroli, a species of hummingbird
 Red-tailed comet, Sappho sparganurus, a species of hummingbird
 Grey-bellied comet, Taphrolesbia griseiventris, another species of hummingbird
 Manx comet, a type of tailless comet

Sports and games

United States
 Baltimore Comets, a defunct North American Soccer League team (1974–75)
 Clinton Comets, an ice hockey team from 1927 to 1973
 Houston Comets, a defunct basketball team
 Kansas City Comets (disambiguation), any of several indoor soccer teams
 Kenosha Comets, an All-American Girls Professional Baseball League team from 1943 to 1951
 Missouri Comets, a Major Indoor Soccer League team
 Mohawk Valley Comets, a former ice hockey team based in Utica, New York (1973–77)
 Mohawk Valley Comets (ACHL), a former Atlantic Coast Hockey League (1985–87)
 Mohawk Valley Comets (NEHL), a former semi-pro North Eastern Hockey League in the 2003–04 season
 Utica Comets, an American Hockey League team
 Comets, the athletics teams and mascot of the University of Texas at Dallas
 Comets, the athletics teams and mascot of Contra Costa College in California
 Comets, the athletics teams and mascot of Olivet College in Michigan
 Comets, the athletics teams and mascot of Palomar College in California

Elsewhere
 Adelaide Comets FC, an Australian soccer club
 Allgäu Comets, an American Football team from Germany
 Dundee Comets, a Scottish ice hockey team
 Ebun Comets, a Nigerian Premier League basketball team
 IK Comet, a defunct Norwegian ice hockey team
 Workington Comets, a speedway club based in Cumbria, UK

Games 
 Comet (card game), a 17th-century French card game still played today

Technology
 Comet (programming), a web application model using server-push communication
 Comet (programming language), used to solve combinatorial optimization problems
 Comet (pyrotechnics), a firework component
 The "Comet" swirl chamber, used in diesel engines
 Comet Lake, a codename for a microprocessor series

Transportation

Airline
 Air Comet, a defunct Spanish airline
 Air Comet Chile, a defunct Peruvian airliner

Aircraft
 Cessna Comet, an early aircraft
 de Havilland Comet, a jet airliner
 de Havilland DH.88 Comet, a British two-seater racing aeroplane
 Dornier Komet, German 1920s airliner
 FK-Lightplanes FK12 Comet German two seat sports/aerobatic homebuilt biplane
 Hockaday Comet, an American two-seat sports aircraft
 Ireland Comet, an American two seat biplane
 Messerschmitt Me 163 Komet, German WW2 rocket interceptor
 Speedtwin E2E Comet 1, a British aerobatic aeroplane
 Vomet Comet - a nickname for aircraft used to simulate zero gravity
 Wedell-Williams Model 44 named the Ring Free Comet, an American racing monoplane
 Yokosuka D4Y (Suisei, "Comet"), a Japanese WW2 dive bomber

Rail
 Comet (railcar)
 Community of Metros (CoMET), a rapid transit benchmarking organization
 Comet (train), of the New York, New Haven & Hartford Railroad
 Comet (interurban), a train of the Sacramento Northern Railway
 The Comet (train), a UK passenger train 1932–1962
 LDE - Comet, a 19th-century German locomotive 
 South Devon Railway Comet class, a type of locomotive

Road
 Mercury Comet, an American automobile
 Leyland Comet, a series of buses and trucks
 James Comet, a British motorcycle produced beginning in 1948
 Vincent Comet, a motorcycle produced in England from 1935 to 1955
 Riley Comet, a version of the Riley 4 motorcar

 The Comet (transit), a transit operator in Columbia, South Carolina

Water
 Comet (1813 steamboat)
 Comet (clipper), an 1851 California clipper which sailed in the Australia trade and the tea trade
 Comet (steamboat), sunk in Lake Superior, USA
 Comet (sternwheeler), in operation from 1871 to 1900
 , a Scottish paddle steamer, operating the first European steamship service (1812)
 , any of several American and British merchant ships
 Comet (dinghy), a class of centreboard sailing boat
 Comet (racing dinghy)

Other uses
 Comet Group, a UK retail chain 
 Comet (cleanser)
 COMET – Competence Centers for Excellent Technologies, in Austria
 Comet Ping Pong, a pizzeria in Washington, D.C.

See also
 Comet assay, an experimental technique for measuring DNA damage
 Komet (disambiguation)
 Shavit (Hebrew for "Comet"), a space launch vehicle